Pareronia tritaea is a butterfly of the family Pieridae. It is found in Indonesia (including Sulawesi) and the Philippines.

Subspecies
P. t. tritaea (northern and central Sulawesi)
P. t. bargylia (southern Sulawesi)
P. t. hermocinia (Banggai Island)
P. t. bilinearis (Selajar)
P. t. octaviae (Tanahdjampea, Kalao)
P. t. illustris (Wangiwangi Island)

tritaea
Butterflies described in 1859